John Scott Biddle (June 7, 1925 – October 1, 2008) was a foremost yachting cinematographer and lecturer, establishing a film-making career that spanned more than forty years.  His films captured not only the technical aspects of sailing but also the human story in events as tranquil as a Nova Scotia cruise and as grand as the America's Cup Races.

Early life
Biddle was born on June 7, 1925, near Philadelphia, the fourth of five children.  His parents, were both from prominent Philadelphia families.
His father was Brigadier General Nicholas Biddle (1893–1977), whose great-grandfather was Nicholas Biddle, President of the Second Bank of the United States.
His mother was Sarah Lippincott Biddle (1894–1962), whose paternal grandfather Joshua Ballinger Lippincott  (1813–1886) founded J. B. Lippincott Company, and maternal grandfather Joseph Wharton (1826–1909) founded the Wharton School of the University of Pennsylvania.  His colorful family included cousins Livingston L. Biddle, Jr. and Anthony Joseph Drexel Biddle, Jr.

Biddle's father served a lifelong term with the National Guard, was active in both World Wars, and was a well-noted, big-game hunter.  He was commissioned to travel the world and bring back specimens; some of his ‘trophies’ still reside at Philadelphia's Academy of Natural Sciences. During Nicholas’ travels, he would film the hunts, then return home and allow young John to experiment with his movie camera and all his unexposed film.

John tinkered further with the camera at his family's summer home in Jamestown, Rhode Island, where he also mastered the idiosyncrasies of ocean sailing. Focusing on his brothers, sisters and twelve cousins as subjects on and around Narragansett Bay, he refined his choice of angles, composition, containment of action within the frame and editing.

School and military years
Biddle, and his many cousins, attended Meadowbrook School, then went on to Kent School in Connecticut.  He turned 18 in 1943 and served in the infantry during World War II.  A bad tooth sent him to the back of the lines during fighting in Belgium. There it was noticed that he could play piano and work a movie projector, so he was assigned to entertain the troops.  Shortly thereafter, he discovered two thirds of his platoon had been killed in a firefight.  His entertaining skills likely had spared his life. They also led to an unlikely occurrence: brother Nicholas Jr., who was fighting in the same region, learned that John was working at the back of the lines and flabbergasted him with a visit.  After the war, John attended Trinity College, then returned overseas to Germany with the First Troop Philadelphia City Cavalry during the Korean War.

Yachting cinematographer
In the 1950s, Biddle spent several years working as an engineer while snapping wedding and baby photos on the side.  His father would have liked him to enter the family insurance business, Biddle, Bishop and Smith (now named Biddle & Company), but John saw a different path.  After watching a John Jay skiing film, he imagined himself doing the same thing with sailing.  The following June he embarked on the 1956 Bermuda Race aboard cousin Charles Wharton's 51-foot cutter, Souvenir with his film camera along.  He combined that footage with three other pieces he shot that summer, and booked himself into yacht clubs for his first lecture-show.

For over four decades, Biddle shot films of dinghy races, Tall Ships events and everything in between. Over seventy types of boats were shown in his documentary-style presentations. 16 mm Bell and Howell in hand, he filmed 130 feet off the deck of square-riggers and fifteen feet underwater.  He filmed from Greenland down to the Islands, from Greece to New Zealand.  He shot ocean races like the Fastnet Race, classic sailing regattas like the Friendship Sloop Regatta, cruises, celebrations, native fishboat races, small boat races.  To capture viewable images on the rolling, bouncy seas, he used (and later marketed) what he called the Biddlestick – a monopod-like stick which he attached to his movie cameras, allowing him to hold onto deck stays while keeping the camera steady.

In addition to his annual show, Biddle made promotional films for boat manufacturers and sailboat classes, filmed a five-episode TV series for Mercury Marine called "Let’s Go Boating" narrated by Lloyd Bridges, and occasionally filmed for private clients.

Lecturer
Each year, Biddle would film three to four events in the summer months, edit the mile of film into a 90-minute presentation in the fall, write a script for same, have music pulled for the film and edit the music to fit.  In winter, he would begin a five-month tour of the United States, Canada, Bermuda, the Caribbean (and occasionally Europe and Australia) where he would present his films in person as many as 100 times, primarily at yacht clubs.  For many of Biddle's audience, his show presented the only opportunity to see the highlights of the past year's sailing events.  One of the great attractions was his ability to catch the amusing and exhilarating aspects of sailing, not only on film, but in his quick-witted, dry-humored delivery peppered with terms like "callapso flapitis", referring to frantic moments on the boat.  Biddle was his own production company, performing the tasks of: contact agent, scheduler, publicist, copywriter, photo developer, poster designer, accountant, cinematographer, film editor, scriptwriter, music editor, driver, porter, set-up man and performer.

Family life
Biddle married Mary McMichael in 1961 in Jamestown, Rhode Island and they had two children, Sophie in 1964 and Scott in 1966.  Mary assisted John in filming the early America's Cup races.  She had a stroke shortly after the birth of Scott and died five years later.  Following this, Biddle managed to spend time at home with his children while continuing his career on the road and was able to include Sophie and Scott on trips to Bermuda, a cruise to Maine and trips to various lecture dates.  In March 1977, he married Amy McKay van Roden in Bryn Mawr, Pennsylvania with three stepchildren: Winifred, Peter and Julie.

Career highlights
Biddle filmed two races multiple times.  The Bermuda Race he sailed 11 times to capture the stories that this pre-eminent, East Coast distance race delivered.  Despite the race's long history and prestige, Biddle is the only film-maker to have focused on it.  He also filmed the international yacht racing event, the America's Cup, all ten times when 12-metre class boats were used, from 1958 to 1987.  For this, he took footage of the Sparkman & Stephens test tanks, of the spring practices, the summer trials, the Newport, Rhode Island balls, the dock happenings and the September finals. He was invited to shoot on board the 12-metre yachts by mercurial skippers  including Ted Turner, Dennis Conner, Ted Hood and Bus Mosbacher.  The rare invitations were granted because of his nautical proficiency and ability to get key shots while staying clear of onboard action.

Final years
After moving to Jamestown in 1980, Biddle became active with the Jamestown Community Chorus and directed the town talent show for several years.

During his career, Biddle created 140 sailing films which he placed into 41 annual lecture shows from 1956 to 1996.  He made over 3,000 presentations to audiences as large as 3,000 people.  In the summer of 2008, Biddle was nominated for induction into the America's Cup Hall of Fame at the Herreshoff Marine Museum in Bristol, Rhode Island. He fell ill with cancer soon thereafter and died on October 1, 2008 at the age of 83 in Middletown, Rhode Island.  The formal induction ceremony was held in April 2009.  Gary Jobson said of Biddle's film-making achievement, “His film archive is one of the most comprehensive and important yachting libraries in existence”.  Biddle was also inducted into the National Sailing Hall of Fame in 2018.

References

Further reading
 The Greenwich Review, "John Biddle: One-Hand-For-The-Boat-And-One-For-The-Camera", by Donna Moffly, April 1974.
 Town & Country, "Philadelphia's Young Voices Challenge the Establishment", by Ellen Kaye, October 1970.

External links
 

1925 births
2008 deaths
America's Cup
American cinematographers
American filmmakers
John
Kent School alumni
American male sailors (sport)
United States Army personnel of World War II
Pennsylvania National Guard personnel